The Apert is a forested mountain, in the western Volcanic Eifel, a mountain range in the German state of Rhineland-Palatinate. It rises about two kilometres south of Büdesheim and is the highest point in the parish (Gemarkung).

Geology 
The region is part of the Rhenish Massif; the basement of the Apert consists of the fossil-rich Büdesheim Slate and Flinz, a rock of the lower Upper Devonian. Fossils of the following biological orders have been found (sometimes as index fossils): Buchiola, Cheiloceras, Goniatites, Clymeniida, Orthoceras and Manticoceras.

References

External links and map 
View from the Apert
Landesamt für Vermessung und Geobasisinformation Rheinland-Pfalz: topographic map 1:25,000 series, Sheet 5705, Gerolstein

Mountains under 1000 metres
Mountains and hills of Rhineland-Palatinate
Mountains and hills of the Eifel